is a district in the Chūō-ku ward of Osaka, Japan and the city's main shopping area. Associated with Shinsaibashi, and west of Mido-suji street, is Amerika-mura, an American-themed shopping area and center of Osaka's youth culture. Major stores and boutiques concentrates are found around the area. Shinsaibashi is easily accessed via the subway.

History

Like many place names in Osaka, the Shinsaibashi shopping district gets its name from one of the many "Machi-bashi" (town bridges) that were built and managed by the local merchants. Shinsaibashi was a much-loved landmark bridge that spanned the Nagahori-gawa canal.

In 1622, at the time of the excavation of the Nagahori-gawa canal, the original 35 metres-long and 4 metres-wide wooden bridge was built by Shinsai Okada, one of the four merchants who dug the Nagahori-gawa canal. The bridge was named after its builder.

As the popularity of Shinmachi to the north and the Dōtonbori theatre district to the south increased, so did the popularity of the shops lining the streets connected by the bridge, establishing the area as Osaka's main shopping district.

The well-used wooden bridge required considerable maintenance and repairs by the townspeople who owned it. In 1873, the wooden bridge was replaced with a 37.1 metres-long and 5.2 metres-wide arched truss iron bridge that had been imported from Germany.  The arched bridge was considered to be quite unusual, and became a popular topic of conversation amongst Osakans.

In 1909, accompanying the construction of a street car along the Nagahori-dori road, the iron bridge was replaced with Osaka's first stone bridge. It was a Western-styled, elegant double arched bridge with a row of four-leafed clovers carved into the railings. At night the bridge was illuminated by eight gas lamps. The bridge was affectionately nicknamed "Eyeglasses bridge" by the townspeople because, with the reflection of its two stone arches in the water, it looked like a pair of glasses.

In 1964, the Nagahori-gawa canal was reclaimed to become a road, the bridge taken down, and the carved railings and the lamps from the stone bridge were used in the construction of a pedestrian overpass. This bridge was used in one of the scenes in the 1989 Hollywood movie Black Rain.

The overpass was removed as a part of the construction of the Crysta Nagahori, an underground shopping mall beneath the Nagahori-dori road. The mall opened in 1997, and the lamps and part of the carved stone railing of the overpass were used for a sidewalk bridge above the mall. Water in the ceiling of the mall flows under the bridge.

In 1973, to commemorate its 100th anniversary, the German-made iron bridge was reconstructed; it is now a pedestrian overpass in Tsurumi Ryokuchi Park.

Retail establishments 

Daimaru
Shinsaibashi-suji Shopping Arcade
OPA
Tokyu Hands
Apple Store
Camera Naniwa
Crysta Nagahori:  an underground shopping mall, 81,765 square meters.
Sinsaibashi ZERO GATE (opening on April 20, 2013 where Shinsaibashi PARCO used to be, housing "H&M")
Coach
Dior
Chanel
Gucci
Louis Vuitton
Diesel
Cartier
Harry Winston
Versace
Armani
Dolce & Gabbana
Giorgio Armani
Rolex
Beams
Hermès
Omega
Givenchy
Yves Saint-Laurent
Dunhill
BVLGARI
Fendi
Samantha Thavasa
Franck Muller
Benetton
Uniqlo
Gap
Ships
United Arrows
H&M
 Vivienne Westwood

Osaka Municipal Subway Stations
Shinsaibashi Station - Midosuji Line (M19), Nagahori Tsurumi-ryokuchi Line (N15)
Yotsubashi Station - Yotsubashi Line (Y14)

Gallery

See also
 List of upscale shopping districts

References

External links

Osaka City Tourism official Shinsaibashi page (map)
Official website for Shinsaibashisuji Shopping Center

Chūō-ku, Osaka
Tourist attractions in Osaka
Shopping districts and streets in Japan
Entertainment districts in Japan
Geography of Osaka
Bridges in Osaka Prefecture